Argentine Township is one of the three townships of Fall River County, South Dakota, United States; most of the rest of the county is unorganized territory. The township lies in the northwestern corner of the county, on the Wyoming border. Burdock lies in the center of the township.

External links
Official map by the United States Census Bureau; Fall River County listed on page 10

Townships in Fall River County, South Dakota
Townships in South Dakota